The International Jugglers' Association or IJA is the world's oldest and largest nonprofit circus organization, and is open to members worldwide. It was founded in the United States in 1947, with the goal of providing, "an organization for jugglers that would provide meetings at regular intervals in an atmosphere of mutual friendship." Although its focus lies on juggling, its programs also support other circus disciplines.

Programs and events
The International Jugglers' Association runs the following programs and events:
 International Regional Competitions
 The Video Tutorial Contest
 World Juggling Day
 eJuggle - the IJA's official publication
 The Afghan Mobile Mini Circus for Children (MMCC)

Conventions and competitions
The International Jugglers' Association holds the largest week-long juggling festival in North America. (The largest juggling festival in the world is the European Juggling Convention, started in 1978 and whose founders were members of the International Jugglers' Association).

The convention is held in a different city each year during mid-to-late July since 1948. There were also additional winter conventions in the 90s. Aside from the competitions, at the convention there are shows open to the public in which professional jugglers perform, and workshops are taught by jugglers of all skill levels.

The organization maintains lists of IJA record-holders, and IJA competitors.

IJA Stage Championship
The IJA's Stage Championships are the formal world juggling championships that offers medals and prize money for juggling performances. These competitions are held during the week at the IJA's annual festival, held in the summer. There are three categories of IJA Stage Championships: Individuals (individual competitors), Teams (two or more people per team) and Juniors (individuals 17 years old or younger). The first annual world juggling championships were held at the Sheraton West Hotel in Los Angeles in 1969.

IJA Online Juggling Championship
In response to COVID-19, IJA created an annual event based on IJA Stage Championships normally held at the annual IJA Festival, but with some modifications to accommodate the circumstances. Instead of a live event, videos submissions judged by the entire attending IJA membership in five categories of Juggling Difficulty, Juggling Creativity, Juggling Execution, Entertainment Value, and Presentation.

IJA Numbers Championships
The Numbers Championships awards Gold, Silver, and Bronze medals to those who demonstrate that they can juggle the most balls, clubs or rings for the highest number of catches. Competition occurs in three categories: Individuals, Duos and Trios. See the current IJA records. Starting at the 2006 convention, prize is given to each "numbers" winner, with an extra prize for anyone who breaks an existing International Jugglers' Association record.
Other competitions held at the IJA's annual festival include the Individual Prop Competitions, the Extreme Juggling Competitions, the World Joggling Championships, as well as traditional (and more informal) juggling games and events.

Publications
The IJA has published Jugglers' World and JUGGLE magazine. In 2012, the IJA transitioned to an all-digital form of communications, halting publication of JUGGLE magazine. Today, members read juggling news through eJuggle, hosted on the IJA's website.

In addition to the online magazine, the IJA also produces a monthly eNewsletter with IJA news, articles of interest, and news from the global juggling community.

Notable members
 Thomas Dietz
 Vova Galchenko
 Marcus Monroe
 Christoph Mitasch
 Manuel Mitasch
 The Passing Zone
 Thom Wall
 Sergeij Ignatov
 Anthony Gatto
 Erin Stephens

Presidents have included Ronald Graham, co-inventor of Mills Mess.

See also
 European Juggling Association, inspired by the International Juggling Association
 World Juggling Federation, an offshoot of the IJA, founded by member Jason Garfield
 , an organization started by Albert Lucas that promotes joggling and sport juggling in general

References

External links

Juggling
Organizations established in 1947